The Greater Markham Area gas fields are natural gas reservoirs and gas production facilities that straddled, or are close to, the UK and Netherlands median line of the southern North Sea. The UK field production facilities, which export gas to the Netherlands, began operation in 1992.

The fields 
The Greater Markham Area gas fields are located in UK Blocks 49/4, 49/5, 49/9 and 49/10 and in Netherlands Blocks J3 and J6 of the southern North Sea. The fields are named: Markham, Windermere, Chiswick, Grove, Stamford and Kew.

Markham 
The Markham gas field was discovered by Ultramar in July 1984 with well 49/05-2. It is a lower Permian Leman/Slochteren sandstone, sourced from Carboniferous coal measures and is overlaid with Permian Silverpit claystone. It is a sweet gas with 83 % methane and a gas/condensate ratio of 9 barrels per million standard cubic feet (9 bbl/MMSCF) or 52.2 m3/106 m3. Recoverable reserves were estimated to be 700 Billion cubic feet (BCF) or 19.8 x 109 m3. Ownership of the gas was established by the UK/Netherlands Markham Treaty as 37.40 % UK and 62.60 % Netherlands.

The original licensee for Markham was a joint venture comprising Ultramar Exploration Ltd (89.50 %), DNO Offshore Ltd (8.00 %) and Ranger Oil (UK) Ltd (2.5 %.). Ownership passed to CH4 Energy Ltd in 2003, Venture Production acquired ownership in 2006. Ownership eventually passed to Centrica, then in 2017 to Spirit Energy a joint venture of Centrica plc and Bayerngas Norge AS.

Windermere 
The UK Windermere gas field produced gas to Markham and hence to the Netherlands. Windermere is a Rotliegend-Leman sandstone discovered in 1989 by well 49/09b-2 by Mobil (who named the field Avalon) and had an estimated gas in place of 104 BCF or 2.8 x 106 m3.

Chiswick, Grove and Kew 
The Chiswick and Kew are both Carboniferous fields Chiswick has gas in place of 687 BCF or 19.45 x 106 m3 and Kew 85 BCF or 2.41 x 106 m3.

Development 
The Greater Markham Area gas fields were developed in stages. Markham and Windermere gas fields were the first to be developed in 1994 and 1996. Gas was produced by two offshore installations, detailed in the table. 

The Chiswick, Grove, Kew and Stamford gas fields were developed over the period 2006-2014 by four offshore installations, detailed in the table.  

In addition to the platforms and subsea wells there were also gas and methanol pipelines and umbilicals in the Greater Markham area.

Production 
Gas production from Greater Markham Area fields is shown in the table and the graphs.  

The production profile, in mcm/y, of the Markham field was as shown.The production profile, in mcm/y, of the Windermere field was as shown.

The production profile, in mcm/y, of the Chiswick field was:The production profile, in mcm/y, of the Grove field was:The production profile, in mcm/y, of the Kew field was:The production profile, in mcm/y, of the Stamford field was:

Decommissioning 
Spirit Energy submitted a Markham ST-1 decommissioning Programme to the Oil and as Authority in 2018. Ineos Oil & Gas UK submitted a Windermere decommissioning Programme to the Oil and as Authority in 2018. Decommissioning activities entailed plugging and abandonment of the wells and removal of all structures above the seabed. The Markham topsides were taken to Lerwick Shetland for dismantling.

See also 

 List of oil and gas fields of the North Sea 
Minke, Orca, Sillimanite and Wingate gas fields

References 

North Sea energy
North Sea
Natural gas fields in the Netherlands
Natural gas fields in the United Kingdom